Ruzha Delcheva (2 August 1915 – 26 November 2002) was a Bulgarian stage and film actress.

She is probably best known for her memorable performance as Madam Zlata, costarring with Georgi Partsalev in the TV musical The Phoney Civilization (1974) directed by Hacho Boyadzhiev. She is also known for her numerous roles on the stage of the Ivan Vazov National Theatre most notably as Masha in Three Sisters by Anton Chekhov, Kostanda in Mother-in-law by Anton Strashimirov, Regina in The Little Foxes by Lillian Hellman and Beatrice in The Duchess of Padua by Oscar Wilde.

Between 1968 and 1970, Ruzha Delcheva was a chairwoman of The Union of Bulgarian Actors (UBA). In 2000, she was decorated with the high government prize the Order Of The Balkan Mountains.

Selected filmography

References

Sources

External links
 

Bulgarian film actresses
Bulgarian stage actresses
Bulgarian television actresses
1915 births
2002 deaths
People from Stara Zagora